Drums of Destiny is a 1937 American Western film directed by Ray Taylor and starring Tom Keene, Edna Lawrence and Budd Buster. Following the War of 1812 a force of American troops are raised to combat Spanish-led Indian attacks from Spanish Florida.

It sometimes confused with the 1937 film Old Louisiana also made by Crescent and starring Keene, which was originally known by this title.

The film's sets were designed by the art director Frank Dexter.

Cast
 Tom Keene as Capt. Jerry Crawford  
 Edna Lawrence as Rosa Maria Dominguez  
 Budd Buster as Kentuck  
 Ray Bennett as Jenkins  
 Robert Fiske as Bill Holston  
 Carlos De Valdez as Don Salvador Dominguez  
 David Sharp as Lt. Bill Crawford  
 John Merton as Toby Simmons
 Chief Flying Cloud as Indian  
 Henry Hall as Pa Green 
 Chief Many Treaties as Indian 
 Aurora Navarro as Rosa Maria's Duenna  
 Artie Ortego as Indian  
 Marin Sais as Ma Green  
 Charles Unger as Johnny Green

See also

 Florida Western

References

Bibliography
 Gevinson, Alan. Within Our Gates: Ethnicity in American Feature Films, 1911-1960. University of California Press, 1997.

External links
 

1937 films
1937 Western (genre) films
1930s historical films
1930s English-language films
American historical films
American Western (genre) films
Films directed by Ray Taylor
Films set in the 1810s
Films set in Florida
American black-and-white films
Seminole Wars
1930s American films